Ulmus × hollandica 'Angustifolia' is one of a number of hybrids arising from the crossing of the Wych Elm U. glabra with a variety of Field Elm U. minor, first identified as Ulmus hollandica var. angustifolia by Weston  in The Universal Botanist and Nurseryman 1: 315, 1770.

Description
The tree was chiefly distinguished by its narrow leaves.

Cultivation
No specimens are known to survive.

References

Dutch elm cultivar
Ulmus articles missing images
Ulmus
Missing elm cultivars